The 1996 United States House of Representatives elections in Texas occurred on November 5, 1996, to elect the members of the state of Texas's delegation to the United States House of Representatives. Texas had thirty seats in the House, apportioned according to the 1990 United States Census.

Texas underwent mid-decade redistricting as a result of the Supreme Court case Bush v. Vera. The court had ruled that districts such as District 18 and District 30 were racially gerrymandered. A prior district court decision had voided the results of the primary elections in 13 districts, which the Supreme Court upheld. These districts instead conducted special elections concurrent with the general elections.

These elections occurred simultaneously with the United States Senate elections of 1996, the United States House elections in other states, and various state and local elections.

Texas Democrats maintained their majority in Texas' congressional delegation, albeit reduced by two seats from 1994. These elections produced an unusually high level of turnover due to the retirements of several representatives.

Overview

Congressional Districts

District 1 
Incumbent Democrat Jim Chapman opted to retire rather than run for re-election.

District 2 
Incumbent Democrat Charlie Wilson opted to retire rather than run for re-election.

District 3 
Incumbent Republican Sam Johnson ran for re-election. The 3rd district was among thirteen districts holding a special election on November 5, the same day as the general election. The race pitted all certified candidates against one another in each district, regardless of party.

District 4 
Incumbent Democrat Ralph Hall ran for re-election.

District 5 
Incumbent Democrat John Wiley Bryant retired to run for U.S. Senator. The 5th district was among thirteen districts holding a special election on November 5, the same day as the general election. The race pitted all certified candidates against one another in each district, regardless of party.

District 6 
Incumbent Republican Joe Barton ran for re-election. The 6th district was among thirteen districts holding a special election on November 5, the same day as the general election. The race pitted all certified candidates against one another in each district, regardless of party.

District 7 
Incumbent Republican Bill Archer ran for re-election. The 7th district was among thirteen districts holding a special election on November 5, the same day as the general election. The race pitted all certified candidates against one another in each district, regardless of party.

District 8 
Incumbent Republican Jack Fields opted to retire rather than run for re-election. The 8th district was among thirteen districts holding a special election on November 5, the same day as the general election. The race pitted all certified candidates against one another in each district, regardless of party.

No candidate received a majority of the vote, so a runoff was held on December 10.

District 9 
Incumbent Republican Steve Stockman ran for re-election. The 9th district was among thirteen districts holding a special election on November 5, the same day as the general election. The race pitted all certified candidates against one another in each district, regardless of party.

No candidate received a majority of the vote, so a runoff was held on December 10.

District 10 
Incumbent Democrat Lloyd Doggett ran for re-election.

District 11 
Incumbent Democrat Chet Edwards ran for re-election.

District 12 
Incumbent Democrat Pete Geren opted to retire rather than run for re-election.

District 13 
Incumbent Republican Mac Thornberry ran for re-election.

District 14 
Incumbent Democrat Greg Laughlin switched his party affiliation to the Republican Party on June 26, 1995. He was defeated in the Republican Primary by former U.S. Representative Ron Paul.

District 15 
Incumbent Democrat Kika de la Garza opted to retire rather than run for re-election.

District 16 
Incumbent Democrat Ronald D. Coleman opted to retire rather than run for re-election.

District 17 
Incumbent Democrat Charles Stenholm ran for re-election.

District 18 
Incumbent Democrat Sheila Jackson Lee ran for re-election. The 18th district was among thirteen districts holding a special election on November 5, the same day as the general election. The race pitted all certified candidates against one another in each district, regardless of party.

District 19 
Incumbent Republican Larry Combest ran for re-election.

District 20 
Incumbent Democrat Henry B. González ran for re-election.

District 21 
Incumbent Republican Lamar Smith ran for re-election.

District 22 
Incumbent Republican Tom DeLay ran for re-election. The 22nd district was among thirteen districts holding a special election on November 5, the same day as the general election. The race pitted all certified candidates against one another in each district, regardless of party.

District 23 
Incumbent Republican Henry Bonilla ran for re-election.

District 24 
Incumbent Democrat Martin Frost ran for re-election. The 24th district was among thirteen districts holding a special election on November 5, the same day as the general election. The race pitted all certified candidates against one another in each district, regardless of party.

District 25 
Incumbent Democrat Ken Bentsen ran for re-election. The 25th district was among thirteen districts holding a special election on November 5, the same day as the general election. The race pitted all certified candidates against one another in each district, regardless of party.

No candidate received a majority of the vote, so a runoff was held on December 10.

District 26 
Incumbent Republican Dick Armey ran for re-election. The 26th district was among thirteen districts holding a special election on November 5, the same day as the general election. The race pitted all certified candidates against one another in each district, regardless of party.

District 27 
Incumbent Democrat Solomon Ortiz ran for re-election.

District 28 
Incumbent Democrat Frank Tejeda ran for re-election.

District 29 
Incumbent Democrat Gene Green ran for re-election. The 29th district was among thirteen districts holding a special election on November 5, the same day as the general election. The race pitted all certified candidates against one another in each district, regardless of party.

District 30 
Incumbent Democrat Eddie Bernice Johnson ran for re-election. The 30th district was among thirteen districts holding a special election on November 5, the same day as the general election. The race pitted all certified candidates against one another in each district, regardless of party.

*Includes one write-in vote

References

Texas
1996
1996 Texas elections